Momčilo Otašević (born 20 February 1990) is a Montenegrin actor.

His native language is Serbian, while he is fluent in English and Italian and has basic knowledge of Russian.

Filmography

Television roles

Movie roles

References

External links

Momcilo Otasevic - Actors – GM Consulting & Production

1990 births
Living people
21st-century Montenegrin male actors
Montenegrin male actors
People from Cetinje